The Paramount Hotel in Portland, Oregon is a hotel building at 808 Southwest Taylor Street in downtown Portland. The Knights of Columbus Building formerly occupied the site. Construction began in the late 1990s. Paramount was completed in 2000, and renovated in 2011.

The restaurant and bar Swank & Swine has occupied the building's first floor since mid-2014. It replaced Asian fusion establishments Tasting East and TE:bar.

References

External links

 

2000 establishments in Oregon
Hotel buildings completed in 2000
Hotels in Portland, Oregon
Southwest Portland, Oregon